Results and statistics from Maria Sharapova's 2005 tennis season.

Yearly summary

Australian Open series 
Sharapova began her season at the Australian Open, as the fourth seed. She reached the semi-finals, defeating Grand Slam debutant Li Na and the previous year's US Open champion Svetlana Kuznetsova en route, before being defeated in the semi-finals by eventual champion Serena Williams in an epic three set thriller on Rod Laver. Sharapova, had several match points in the final set, but ended up losing it 6–8.

Indian Wells & Miami 
Sharapova reached the semi-finals at Indian Wells for the first time, but she would suffer the ignominy of a double bagel defeat, failing to win a single game against Lindsay Davenport. This would turn out to be Sharapova's only career defeat against Davenport. She fared much better in Miami though, beating the likes of Justine Henin-Hardenne and Venus Williams en route to the final. In the final, she lost in straight sets to Kim Clijsters.

European clay court season 
Sharapova first clay event of the season was the Berlin Open where she was the first seed. She lost in straight sets in the quarters, to eventual champion Justine Henin-Hardenne. Her next tournament was the Internazionali B.N.L D'Italia Open. She lost in the semifinals to Swiss Patty Schnyder, in three sets after winning the first set. Her final clay tournament of the year was the French Open where she reached the quarterfinals. In the quarters she lost to Justine Henin-Hardenne, for the second and final time in the season.

Grass court season 
Sharapova successfully defended her title in Birmingham, defeating future rivals Samantha Stosur and Tatiana Golovin, before defeating, future world number one, Jelena Janković in a three set final.

As the defending champion at Wimbledon, Sharapova navigated her way through to the semi-finals without the loss of a set (and serve, with the exception of her third round victory against Katarina Srebotnik), before being defeated by eventual champion Venus Williams; the defeat ending a 22-match winning streak on grass dating back to the 2003 Wimbledon 4th Round.

US Open series 
A week before the start of the US Open, Sharapova claimed the World No. 1 ranking for the first time, succeeding Lindsay Davenport. Subsequently, she was named top seed at a Major tournament for the first time, at the US Open, where she reached the semi-finals to complete the feat of having reached at least the quarter-final stage at each of the four Majors.

Sharapova won her first four matches for the loss of just 12 games, before being sternly tested by compatriot Nadia Petrova in the quarter-finals, before winning in three sets. In the semi-finals, she lost to eventual champion Kim Clijsters in three sets. This marked the fourth consecutive Major tournament in which Sharapova was defeated by the eventual champion. Despite this defeat, Sharapova reclaimed the World No. 1 ranking following the tournament, having improved from her third round showing from 2004.

Fall series 
Sharapova's first of two fall tournaments was the 2005 Beijing Open. She had a lot of points here, after making it to the semifinals last year falling to compatriot Svetlana Kuznetsova. She won her first match in a rollercoaster three setter, 6–0, 5–7, 6–2. Then she won her second round easily, in straight sets. In her semifinal match versus Maria Kirilenko, she had to retire the match due to injury.

Sharapova's Next tournament was the Kremlin Cup in Moscow. In her opening round match versus Anna-Lena Grönefeld, she was up 6–1, 4–2, when Grönefeld had to retire the match due to injury. Her next match was versus fellow Russian and future World No.1, Dinara Safina. Sharapova lost after taking the first set 6–1. This was her first loss after winning the opening set since May.

WTA Tour Championships 
Sharapova qualified for the year-end WTA Tour Championships for the second year in a row, having picked up three titles during the season. She was drawn in the Green Group along with Lindsay Davenport, Patty Schnyder and Nadia Petrova. Sharapova won two of her three matches, the only loss coming to Petrova in the last match. Sharapova qualified for the semi-finals after finishing first in her group; thus, the semi-final saw her drawn against Amélie Mauresmo, in which she was defeated in straight sets, bringing an end to her 2005 season.

All matches 
This table chronicles all the matches of Sharapova in 2005, including walkovers (W/O) which the WTA does not count as wins. They are marked ND for non-decision or no decision.

Singles matches (Grand Slams and Premier 5)

Tournament schedule

Singles Schedule

Yearly Records

Head-to-head matchups 
Maria Sharapova vs. Justine Henin-Hardenne 1-2

Maria Sharapova vs. Venus Williams 1-1

Maria Sharapova vs. Lindsay Davenport 2-1

Maria Sharapova vs. Maria Kirilenko 1-1

Maria Sharapova vs. Kim Clijsters 0-2

Maria Sharapova vs. Serena Williams 0-1

Finals

Singles: 4 (3–1)

See also 
 2005 Serena Williams tennis season
 2005 WTA Tour

References

External links 

Maria Sharapova tennis seasons
Sharapova, Maria
2005 in Russian tennis